Casimir von Arx (30 October 1852 – 7 March 1931) was a Swiss politician, mayor of Olten (1890–1902) and President of the Swiss Council of States (1902).

References

Further reading

External links 
 
 

1852 births
1931 deaths
People from Olten
Swiss Old Catholics
Free Democratic Party of Switzerland politicians
Members of the Council of States (Switzerland)
Presidents of the Council of States (Switzerland)
Mayors of places in Switzerland